Gong Hyung-jin (born April 10, 1969) is a South Korean actor. While best known as a supporting actor notably in Taegukgi, Liar, Marrying the Mafia II and Alone in Love, Gong has also played leading roles in North Korean Guys and Life Is Beautiful.

Filmography

Film

 Well, Let's Look at the Sky Sometimes (1990)
 Life Isn't a Multiple Choice Test (1991)
 I Want to Live Just Until 20 Years Old (1992)
 Goodbye Seoul Shinpa (1993)
 Love in the Rain (1994)
 A Growing Business (1999)
 Peppermint Candy (2000)
 The Legend of Gingko (2000)
 Why Do I Want to Be a Boxing Referee? (short film, 2000) 
 Last Present (2001)
 Failan (2001)
 Out of Justice (2001)
 My Beautiful Girl, Mari (2002)
 Oh! Lala Sisters (2002)
 Over the Rainbow (2002) (cameo)
 Surprise Party (2002) (cameo)
 A Perfect Match (2002)
 Wet Dreams (2002) (cameo)
 Blue (2003)
 Star (2003) (cameo)
 Love Impossible (2003)
 Oh! Brothers (2003) (cameo)
 The Greatest Expectation (2003) (cameo)
 My Daddy (short film, 2003)
 North Korean Guys (2003)
 Taegukgi (2004)
 Liar (2004)
 Everybody Has Secrets (2004) (cameo)
 Marrying the Mafia II (2005)
 Mr. Housewife (Quiz King) (2005)
 Barefoot Ki-bong (2006) (cameo)
 Marrying the Mafia III (2006)
 Yobi, the Five Tailed Fox (2007)
 Life Is Beautiful (2008)
 Like You Know It All (2009)
 Good Morning President (2009) (cameo)
 The Servant (2010)
 Couples (2011)
 Roman Holiday (2017)

Television series
 Queen (SBS, 1991)
 Lovers (MBC, 2001)
 You're Not Alone (SBS, 2004)
 Alone in Love (SBS, 2006)
 Dal-ja's Spring (KBS2, 2007) 
 Saranghae (I Love You) (SBS, 2008)
 Star's Lover (SBS, 2008) (cameo, episode 1)
 The Slave Hunters (KBS2, 2010)
 The Fugitive: Plan B (KBS2, 2010)
 The Duo (MBC, 2011)
 My Husband Got a Family (KBS2, 2012) (cameo)
 Totally Her (E-Channel, 2012)
 All About My Romance (SBS, 2013)
 Basketball (tvN, 2013)
 Angel Eyes (SBS, 2014)
 Everybody Say Kimchi (MBC, 2014) (cameo)
 Righteous Love (tvN, 2014) (cameo)
 Let's Eat 2 (tvN 2015) cameo 
 Last (jTBC, 2015)
A Beautiful Mind (KBS2, 2016)

Variety/radio show
 X-Man (SBS, 2004-2005)
 Cine Town with Gong Hyung-jin (SBS Power FM, 2009-2015)
 King of Mask Singer (MBC, 2015) - "Merchant in Venice"
 Enjoy Today (SBS, 2010-2011)
 Taxi (tvN, 2009-2012)
 Entertainment in TV (TV Chosun, 2011) 
 Actor Pop Star (SBS, 2012)
 Appeal (MBC Every 1, 2012)
 Fantasy Girl (tvN, 2013)
 A Celebrity Is Living in Our House (MBC Every 1, 2014)

Theater
Kleopatra (2009)
Defending the Caveman (2009-2010)
Hairspray (2012)

Discography
"Prosecutor Bong's Proposal", "I Always Miss You 2005" (Gong Hyung-jin; Marrying the Mafia II OST; 2005)
"We" (Gong Hyung-jin, Kim Seung-woo, Lee Ha-na, Jang Dong-gun, Ji Jin-hee and Hwang Jung-min; single; 2010)
"Do It For You" (The One feat. Gong Hyung-jin, Suho and Ko Woo-ri; 2011)
"Our Love Shines" (Kim Joo-hyuk, Lee Si-young, Gong Hyung-jin, Lee Yoon-ji and Oh Jung-se; Couples OST; 2011)

Awards and nominations

References

External links
 
 Gong Hyung-jin Fan Cafe at Daum 
 
 
 

1969 births
Living people
South Korean male film actors
South Korean male television actors
South Korean male stage actors
South Korean television presenters
Male actors from Seoul
Chung-Ang University alumni